is a public park in Nerima Ward, Tokyo, Japan.

Overview
Fujimi Pond is located in the park, and like the ponds in Shakujii Park, Inokashira Park, and Zenpukuji Park, this pond is formed by spring water from the Musashino Terrace. It is possible to go boating on the pond. The park is also a famous spot for cherry blossoms.

It opened as a private park in the Taishō era, and since then, playground equipment and other facilities have been added.

Access
 By train: 5 minutes’ walk from Higashi-Fushimi Station on the  Seibu Shinjuku Line

See also
 Parks and gardens in Tokyo
 National Parks of Japan

References

 Website of Nerima City (in Japanese)

External links
 Website of Let’s Go to the Park with 1,000 Yen! (in Japanese)
Parks and gardens in Tokyo